Tulayl was a Palestinian Arab village in the Safad Subdistrict located  northeast of Safad. It was situated on a hill near Lake Hula. Together with the nearby village of al-Husayniyya, it had a population of 340 in 1945. Tulayl was depopulated during the 1948 Palestine War.

History
The village was built on the site of the Roman town of Thella. The 1st-century historian, Josephus, mentions the village in his day with reference to the extent of Upper Galilee and which stretched "in length from Meroth to Thella, a village near Jordan."

Ottoman era
Under the Ottoman Empire, in 1596, Tulayl was a part of the  nahiya  ("subdistrict") of Jira, under the administration of Safad Sanjak, with a population of 215, or 36 households and 3 bachelors, all Muslims.  They paid a fixed tax-rate of 25% on agricultural products, including wheat, barley, bees, and water buffalos; a total of 3,107 Akçe. 1/12 of the revenue went to a Waqf.

In 1881, the PEF's Survey of Western Palestine (SWP)  described the place as having "modern cattle-sheds and traces of ruins of basaltic stone". The houses were built of adobe and cane. In the second half of the 19th century, after the Algerian followers of Abdelkader El Djezairi had been defeated by the French in Algeria, they sought refuge in another part of the Ottoman Empire, and were given lands in various locations in Ottoman Syria, including Tulayl, and the nearby villages of Dayshum, Ammuqa, Al-Husayniyya and Marus.

British Mandate era
In the 1922 census of Palestine conducted by the British Mandate authorities,  Tulail  had a population of 196; all Muslims.  In the 1931 census it was counted with al-Husayniyya, and together they had a population of  274, still all  Muslims,  in  a total of 64 houses.

During this period Tulayl expanded westward while al-Husayniyya expanded eastward, and the two became contiguous, sharing a school and other amenities. The population was Muslim, and were mostly farmers and fishermen. A large number of inhabitants were employed in cereal farming.

In the 1945 statistics the village area  comprised a total area of 5,324 dunams.

Types of land use in dunams in the village in 1945:

The land ownership of the village before occupation in dunams:

1948, and aftermath
Tulayl was captured by Israel during its offensive Operation Yiftach in the 1948 Arab-Israeli War, probably according to Israeli historian Benny Morris in April 1948. According to Palestinian historian Walid Khalidi in 1992, "The village site is thickly covered with grass and other vegetation, including some eucalyptus and palm trees. Only one old stone house, with an arched doorway, remains standing".

References

Sources

External links
Welcome To Tulayl
Tulayl, Zochrot
Survey of Western Palestine, map 4:  IAA, Wikimedia commons
Tulayl, from the Khalil Sakakini Cultural Center
 Tulayl, Dr. Khalil Rizk. 

Arab villages depopulated during the 1948 Arab–Israeli War
District of Safad